The Goodbye Girl is the second studio album by Australian rock band Epicure. It was released on 8 March 2004 on Flugelhorn Records via MGM Distribution. It peaked at No. 88 on the ARIA Albums Chart, No. 20 on the Australasian Artists Albums and No. 5 on the Hitseekers Albums charts.

Track listing

 "Goodbye Girl" - 3:07
 "Armies Against Me" - 5:11
 "Firing Squad" - 4:15
 "Sunlight (for Bronwyn)" - 4:47
 "So Broken" - 4:23
 "Life Sentence" - 4:49
 "Twelve Months of Winter" - 4:52
 "Clay Pigeons" - 6:48
 "Self Destruct in Five" - 4:02
 "Rainy Day" - 4:35
 "No-one's Listening" - 4:58
 "Distant Seas" - 7:14

Personnel 
Produced by Cameron McKenzie and Epicure.
Recorded and mixed by Cameron McKenzie at Station Place, Melbourne, except for "Firing Squad", which was mixed by Chris Dickie.

Charts

References

2004 albums
Epicure (band) albums